The Aegon GB Pro-Series Barnstaple was a tournament for professional female tennis players played on indoor hardcourts. The event was classified as a $25,000 ITF Women's Circuit tournament. It was held in Barnstaple, England, from 2008 to 2015. In 2014 the event was downgraded from a $75K tournament to a $25K.

Past finals

Singles

Doubles

External links
 

ITF Women's World Tennis Tour
Hard court tennis tournaments
Tennis tournaments in England
Recurring sporting events established in 2008
Recurring sporting events disestablished in 2015
Defunct tennis tournaments in the United Kingdom